Cochylis cataphracta is a species of moth of the family Tortricidae. It is found in Venezuela.

The wingspan is about 26 mm. The ground colour of the forewings is whitish, suffused with pale brownish to beyond the middle, greyish subterminally and dotted with brown.

Etymology
The species name refers to the sclerotization of large parts of the sterigma and is derived from cataphracta (meaning armoured).

References

Moths described in 2006
Cochylis